Rhubarb rhubarb could refer to:

 Rhubarb Rhubarb, a 1980 British comedy film starring Eric Sykes
 Rhubarb (sound effect), the filmmaking term for background crowd speech